Janaki is a rural municipality in Banke District located in Lumbini Province of Nepal.

The rural municipality was established In 2017 while the Nepalese government restructured 753 new local level units cancelling the old thousands of local level units. The rural municipality was created merging the then five following VDCs: Saigaun, Belbhar, Khajura Khurda, Belahari and Ganapur. A small portion (ward no. 23) of the then Nepalganj (the rural area) was also merged with this new local level unit.

Demographics
At the time of the 2011 Nepal census, Janaki Rural Municipality had a population of 37,847. Of these, 59.8% spoke Awadhi, 22.5% Urdu, 13.3% Nepali, 2.1% Maithili, 0.6% Magar, 0.4% Doteli, 0.4% Tharu, 0.3% Newar, 0.2% Bhojpuri and 0.4% other languages as their first language.

In terms of ethnicity/caste, 22.3% were Musalman, 8.7% Yadav, 7.3% Kurmi, 7.0% Chamar/Harijan/Ram, 6.8% Chhetri, 6.0% Kanu, 4.0% other Dalit, 2.9% Magar, 2.5% other Terai and 32.5% others.

In terms of religion, 76.4% were Hindu, 22.2% Muslim, 0.7% Christian, 0.4% Buddhist, 0.1% Kirati and 0.2% others.

References

Populated places in Banke District
Rural municipalities of Nepal established in 2017